Haki is an Albanian masculine given name. People with the name Haki include:
Haki Abaz Skuqi (1958– 1986), Albanian military officer and aviator 
Haki Doku (born 1969), Albanian para-cyclist
Haki Korça (born 1919), Albanian footballer 
Haki Madhubuti (born 1942), American author, educator, and poet
Haki Stërmilli (1895–1953), Albanian writer and journalist
Haki Toska (born 1920), Albanian politician

References

Albanian masculine given names